The Last Defender of Camelot is a collection of short stories written by science fiction writer Roger Zelazny. It was published by Ibooks, Inc in 2002 and has an identical title to an earlier collection.

Contents

 "Introduction" by Robert Silverberg
 "Comes Now the Power"
 "For a Breath I Tarry"
 "Engine at Heartspring's Center"
 "Halfjack"
 "Home is the Hangman"
 "Permafrost"
 "LOKI 7281"
 "Mana from Heaven"
 "24 Views of Mt. Fuji, by Hokusai"
 "Come Back to the Killing Ground, Alice, My Love"
 "The Last Defender of Camelot"

References

2002 short story collections
Short story collections by Roger Zelazny